Happy New Year is a 2008 Swiss drama film directed by Christoph Schaub. It was entered into the 31st Moscow International Film Festival.

Cast
 Nils Althaus as Kaspar
 Denise Virieux as Gloria
 Johanna Bantzer as Nina
 Pascal Holzer as Oliver
 Bruno Cathomas as Pascal
 Lou Haltinner as Karin
 Jörg Schneider as Herbert
 Irene Fritschi as Anne-Marie
 Annina Euling as Zoe
 Katharina von Bock as Christina
 Joel Basman as Oskar

References

External links
 

2008 films
2008 drama films
Swiss drama films
2000s German-language films
Swiss German-language films